Swimming at the 1972 Summer Paralympics consisted of 56 events, 28 for men and 28 for women.

Medal summary

Medal table

Participating nations

Men's events

Women's events

References

External links 
 

1972 Summer Paralympics events
1972
Paralympics